The Somerset County Football Association, also known as the Somerset FA, is the governing body of football in the county of Somerset.  The association was formed in 1885.

History 

The Somerset County Football Association was formed in 1885.  There was a very small number of clubs at that time and no mandatory requirement to be affiliated.  It is very different from today where there are in excess of 800 clubs which equates to probably more than 2,000 teams.

The first Secretary was a Mr H J Ker Thompson of Burnham-on-Sea who resigned in 1896.  At the time there was no appointed Chairman, one would be co-opted on the night of Council Meetings.  Regular meeting venues were the Hare & Hounds – Shepton Mallet, The Swan Hotel – Wells, The Commercial Hotel – Midsomer Norton, Waldegrave Arms – Radstock, Star Hotel – Wells and Wells Town Hall.  An average attendance was fifteen with the bulk of clubs coming from the old mining area of North Somerset.  In 1904 the then Secretary/Treasurer became the first paid official with a salary of £25.00 per annum.

Charles J Lewin, who joined Council in July 1896 was appointed the Association's first Chairman in June 1904.  He was a Radstock Headmaster and was also elected Somerset’s first ever member to the full Council of the English FA and retained both positions over the period of two world-wars.  As a result of age and infirmity he resigned on 6 June 1945 ending a remarkable record of service to Somerset football, covering 49 years and was awarded a gold medal in recognition of his service. 

A list of the County FA's key officials is provided below:

Presidents (year took office)
H E Murray Anderson  (1896)
W J Bown (1946)
Alderman E Sheldon (1949)
Rt. Hon. Viscount Alexander of Hillsborough (1950)
H M Scott MBE JP (1952)
E J King (1977)
H Angell (1977)
F P Hillier MBE JP (1997 )

Chairmen (year took office)
C J Lewin (1904)
W J Bown (1945)
F S Carpenter (1949)
D G Cummins (1966)
A J Hobbs (1984)

Secretary  (year took office)
H J Ken Thompson (resigned 1886)
H A Sheldon (1886)
H J Cockram (1898)
Messrs Bown & Holloway (1919)
F Holloway (1945)
C A Webb (1950)
L J Webb (1964)
Mrs H Marchment (1991)
J Pike (2007)

Affiliated Leagues

Men's Saturday Leagues
Somerset County Football League (1890)
Bath and District Football League (1901)
Bristol and Avon Football League (1910)
Mid-Somerset Football League (1950)
Perry Street and District Football League (1903)
Weston-Super-Mare and District Football League (1903)
Yeovil and District Football League (1903)

Men's Sunday Leagues
Bath and District Football League
Blackmore Vale Football League (1914) – Sunday
Bridgwater & District Sunday Football League (1966)
Frome & District Sunday Football League (1968)
Taunton & District Sunday Football League
Weston-Super-Mare Sunday Football League
Yeovil Sunday Football League (1975)

Youth Leagues
Somerset Floodlight Youth Football League
Midsomer Norton & District Youth Football League
Taunton Youth Football League
Woodspring Junior Football League 
Yeovil and District Youth Football League

Ladies Leagues
Somerset County Women’s Football League
Somerset Girls' Football League

Affiliated Member Clubs

Among the notable clubs that are affiliated to the Somerset County FA are:

Bath City
Bishop Sutton
Brislington
Bridgwater Town
Bristol City
Bristol Manor Farm
Chard Town
Clevedon Town
Glastonbury Town

Frome Town
Hengrove Athletic
Keynsham Town
Larkhall Athletic
Minehead
Odd Down
Oldland Abbotonians
Paulton Rovers
Portishead Town

Radstock Town
Shepton Mallet
Street
Taunton Town
Wellington
Wells City
Welton Rovers
Weston-super-Mare
Wincanton Town
Yeovil Town

County Cup Winners

References

External links

County football associations
Football in Somerset
Sports organizations established in 1885